The Madagascar Green Party/Parti Vert (abbreviated AMHM) is a political party in Madagascar, led by Alexandre Marie Georget. In the 2013 general election, the party won 2 seats.

References 

Political parties in Madagascar
Green political parties